Assessing Writing is a quarterly peer-reviewed academic journal covering the assessment of written language in language education. It was established in 1994, and is published by Elsevier. The editor-in-chief are Martin East and David Slomp.

Abstracting and indexing 
The journal is abstracted and indexed in:

External links 
 
 Print: 
 Online: 

Elsevier academic journals
Language education journals
Quarterly journals
English-language journals
Publications established in 1994